is a former Japanese football player.

Playing career
Washida was born in Fukui on November 15, 1978. After graduating from high school, he joined J1 League club JEF United Ichihara in 1997. However he could not play at all in the match until 1998. In 1999, he moved to newly was promoted to J2 League club, Montedio Yamagata. He played many matches as center back from 1999 and became a regular player from 2001. In 2004, he returned to JEF United Ichihara. However he could hardly play in the match. In 2005, he moved to J2 club Kyoto Purple Sanga. Although the club won the champions in 2005 and was promoted to J1 from 2006, he could not play many matches in both seasons. In 2007, he moved to J2 club Montedio Yamagata again and played many matches. In 2008, he moved to Japan Football League (JFL) club Tochigi SC. He played as regular player and the club was promoted to J2 end of 2008 season. However he moved to JFL club FC Ryukyu in 2009. Although he played many matches in 2009, he could not play at all in the match in 2010. In June 2010, he moved to Prefectural Leagues club SC Sagamihara. He retired end of 2010 season.

Club statistics

References

External links

kyotosangadc

1978 births
Living people
People from Fukui (city)
Association football people from Fukui Prefecture
Japanese footballers
J1 League players
J2 League players
Japan Football League players
JEF United Chiba players
Montedio Yamagata players
Kyoto Sanga FC players
Tochigi SC players
FC Ryukyu players
SC Sagamihara players
Association football defenders